The Beechcraft 60 Duke is an American-built twin-engine fixed-wing aircraft designed and produced by Beechcraft. The aircraft has retractable tricycle landing gear and a pressurized cabin. The two piston engines are turbocharged and the turbochargers also pressurize the cabin with bleed air.

Design
The development of the Beechcraft 60 began in early 1965, and it was designed to fill the gap between the Beechcraft Baron and the Beechcraft Queen Air. On December 29, 1966, the prototype made its first flight. On February 1, 1968, the FAA issued the type certificate. Distribution to customers began in July 1968. The passenger cabin is fitted with club seating and entry is by means of a port-side airstair entry door in the rear fuselage.

The Beechcraft A60, which came onto the market in 1970, represented an advancement over the Baron, with an improved pressurized cabin utilizing advanced bonded honeycomb construction, lighter and more efficient turbochargers, and improved elevators. The last variant, the B60, was introduced in 1974. The interior arrangement was renewed and the engine efficiency again increased by improved turbochargers. The Beechcraft 60 was, despite its very good performance, only a moderate seller, principally because the complicated technology demanded a high expenditure on maintenance. Production was stopped in 1983.

Most of the Duke B-60s still flying have retained their original equipment.  Electro-mechanical systems, which were highly advanced when the aircraft was introduced, were superseded in other aircraft with simpler I/C controlled mechanical parts.  The aircraft design uses turbocharged Lycoming TIO541-B4 engines that develop  each. Other systems, parts, and FAA-certified technicians are increasingly difficult to locate. Normally, pilots figure , plus another  for each takeoff and climb as typical fuel consumption for cross-country planning. Owners compare the Beechcraft B60 to classic sports cars—noting that they do not fly Dukes to economize.

Modifications

Some Dukes have been modified by Rocket Engineering of Spokane, Washington, replacing the Lycoming reciprocating engines with Pratt & Whitney Canada PT6A-21 or -35 turbine engines.

The supplemental type certificate was issued on 2006-05-12.

Operation

The Duke was purchased by corporate and private pilot owners. Most were registered in the United States but examples were exported to many countries including Argentina, Australia, Brazil, Canada, Croatia, Finland, France, Germany, Honduras, Iceland, Serbia, Slovenia, Sweden, Switzerland, South Africa and the United Kingdom. One Duke was flown by the Jamaica Defense Force. Many remain in service in the early twenty-first century.

In reviewing the aircraft in 2008, Rick Durden of AVweb stated,

Production figures

 Beechcraft 60 : 125 
 Beechcraft A60 : 121 
 Beechcraft B60: 350

Specifications (B60)

Operators

Military operators
 
  Jamaica Defence Force

See also

Notes

Bibliography
Donald, David (editor). The Encyclopedia of World Aircraft. Leicesrer, UK:Blitz Editions, 1997. .
 
Simpson, Rod. Airlife's World Aircraft. Airlife Publishing Ltd, Shrewsbury, England, 2001. .
Simpson, Rod. The General Aviation Handbook. Midland Publishing, Hinckley, England, 2005. .
Taylor, John W.R. Jane's All The World's Aircraft 1976–77. London:Jane's Yearbooks, 1976. .
Wheeler, Barry C. "World's Air Forces 1979". Flight International, August 4, 1979. Vol. 116, No. 3672. pp. 333–386.

External links

Duke
1960s United States civil utility aircraft
Low-wing aircraft
Aircraft first flown in 1966
Twin piston-engined tractor aircraft